Cloud Busting is a children's novel by Malorie Blackman, published in 2004. It is written in verse, with each chapter using a different type of poetry. 

The novel won the Nestlé Children's Book Prize Silver Award and was longlisted for the Carnegie Medal.

Plot
Mr Mackie, the teacher, assigns the homework to the class: to write a poem. Sam wants to write his poem about Davey. Alex, his ex-best friend, mocks him for doing so. Sam quotes:
"I want to write my poem about Davey.
Because now he's gone
And I can't get him out of my head!"

Davey, or 'Fizzy Feet', is a new boy. Everyone hates him. He has holes in his jumper, and strange ideas fill his mind. Sam, the school bully, makes fun of him. He dislikes Davey at least as much as everyone else until Davey saves his life by pulling him from in front of a speeding vehicle. The two soon become friends.

Davey's way of looking at life begins to seem fun. Sam learns that Davey has an allergy to dairy, and Davey tells him to keep it a secret to avoid a fuss. In front of the bully, Alex, he accidentally lets it slip. Alex, as a joke, offers Davey a part of his sandwich, with a cheese slipped inside. Davey immediately has an allergic reaction, and Mr Mackie is forced to use the epipen. Davey regains consciousness and is whisked to hospital. Davey begins to avoid Sam after letting his secret slip. He loses his eccentric imagination. 

Davey and Sam should have gone to the park to go Cloud Busting together and become best friends again, this time not in secret.

What actually happened was Sam Cloud Busting alone. Davey, telling no one, slipped away and left Sam alone thinking hard.

References

2004 British novels
2004 children's books
2004 poetry books
British children's novels
Children's verse novels